43va Heartless (stylized 43VA HEARTLESS) is the second studio album by American rapper Moneybagg Yo. It was released on May 24, 2019, through Collective Music Group, Bread Gang Entertainment, N-Less Entertainment, and Interscope Records. The album features collaborations with Gunna, City Girls, Offset, Lil Durk, Blac Youngsta, and Kevin Gates. The album debuted at number four on the US Billboard 200.

Background
The album is the third and final installment in Moneybagg Yo's Heartless series, following Heartless (2017) and 2 Heartless (2018).

Commercial performance
43va Heartless debuted at number four on the US Billboard 200, earning 40,000 album-equivalent units (including 5,000 pure album sales) in its first week. It became his highest-charting album at the time. The album also outsold other notable releases that week like YG's 4Real 4Real. One song on the album, "Dior" (featuring Gunna), is certified gold.

Track listing
Credits adapted from Tidal.

Notes
  signifies an additional producer
  signifies an uncredited co-producer

Personnel
Credits adapted from Tidal.

Performers
 Moneybagg Yo – primary artist
 Gunna – featured artist (track 3)
 City Girls – featured artist (track 5)
 Offset – featured artist (track 7)
 Lil Durk – featured artist (track 8)
 Blac Youngsta – featured artist (track 11)
 Kevin Gates – featured artist (track 13)

Technical
 Skywalker OG – recording engineering (all tracks), mixing engineering (all tracks)
 Leo Goff – mixing (all tracks)
 Tony Wilson – mastering (all tracks)

Production
 Drumgod – producer (tracks 1, 2, 4-6, 11, 12, 14)
 DMacTooBangin – producer (tracks 2-5, 11, 12)
 Seph Got the Waves – producer (track 6)
 P.Kaldone – producer (track 6)
 June James – producer (tracks 7, 8)
 Tay Keith – producer (track 9)
 Fuse – producer (track 10)
 Nagra – producer (track 10)
 Yung Lan – producer (track 13)
 Javar Rockamore – producer (track 14)

Charts

Weekly charts

Year-end charts

References

2019 albums
Moneybagg Yo albums
Collective Music Group albums